The Burkinabe ambassador to Austria is the official representative of the Government in Ouagadougou to the Government of Austria. He is concurrently accredited in Belgrade (Serbia), Zagreb (Croatia), Budapest (Hungary), Prague (Czech Republic), Brünn (Slovakia) Ljubljana (Slovenia), (United Nations Office at Vienna).

List of representatives

References 

 
Austria
Burkina Faso